Rimal Haxhiu (born 4 March 1999) is an Albanian footballer who plays as a winger for Tirana in the Albanian Superliga.

Career

Germany
Following a youth career with Partizani Tirana in his native Albania, Haxhiu joined German club Blumenthaler SV in 2018. In January 2019, Xaxhiu moved to Bremer SV.

Luftëtari
In January 2020, Xaxhiu joined Albanian Superliga club KF Luftëtari. He made his league debut for the club on 2 February 2020 in a 3–0 home defeat to former club Partizani Tirana.

References

External links
Rimal Haxhiu at Bremer SV

1999 births
Living people
Albanian footballers
Association football forwards
Albania youth international footballers
Kategoria Superiore players
Kategoria e Parë players
Luftëtari Gjirokastër players
Bremer SV players
Albanian expatriate footballers
Albanian expatriate sportspeople in Germany
Expatriate footballers in Germany